Kuveh may refer to:
 Kuveh, Bandar Abbas
 Kuveh, Qeshm